AF4/FMR2 family member 2 is a protein that in humans is encoded by the AFF2 gene. Mutations in AFF2 are implicated in cases of breast cancer.

CCG repeat expansions in this gene are associated with X-linked intellectual disability and specifically a syndrome known as Fragile XE mental retardation (FRAXE). FRAXE is one of the most common forms of non-syndromic X-linked intellectual disability. The gene is also known as FMR2 (Fragile Mental Retardation 2) after this condition.

Genomics

This gene is located on the long arm of chromosome X (Xq27.3-Xq28) It has 22 exons spanning at least 500 kb. Alternative splicing may occur and involve exons 2, 3, 5, 7 and 21. The normal encoded protein is 1311 codons in length. It is expressed as an 8.7 kilobase transcript in the placenta and adult brain.

The normal 5' untranslated region has 10-35 CCG repeats and more frequently 15–20. Pathogenic expansions have typically over 200 repeats and are methylated.

This gene belongs to the AFF family of genes which currently has four members: AFF1/AF4, AFF2/FMR2, AFF3/LAF4 and AFF4/AF5q31. All AFF proteins are localized in the nucleus and have a role as transcriptional activators with a positive action on RNA elongation. AFF2/FMR2, AFF3/LAF4 and AFF4/AF5q31 localize in nuclear speckles (subnuclear structures considered to be storage/modification sites of pre-mRNA splicing factors) and are able to bind RNA with a high apparent affinity for the G-quadruplex structure. They appear to modulate alternative splicing via the interaction with the G-quadruplex RNA-forming structure.

The other members of this family have been reported to form fusion genes as a consequence of chromosome translocations  and are involved in  the pathogenesis of myeloid/lymphoid or mixed lineage leukemia.

References

Further reading

External links 
 

Intellectual disability
Genetic diseases and disorders